The RD-801 is a Ukrainian liquid propellant rocket engine burning LOX and Kerosene (RG-1) in a staged combustion cycle. It has a single combustion chamber that provides thrust vector control by gimbaling of the nozzle in two axis by +/- 6°. It is being designed in Ukraine by Yuzhnoye Design Bureau for the prospective first stage propulsion of the Mayak rocket family.

The RD-801 as well as the RD-810 are being designed based on the work of the RD-8 vernier and the maintenance and improvement of the RD-120 engines. The RD-801 can be used stand alone on a Mayak or in a cluster.

Versions

The designers have proposed three versions of this engine:
 RD-801 (version 0): This is the basic module with no TVC.
 RD-801 (version 01): This is a version which includes a TVC by gimbaling of the nozzle in two axis by +/- 6°.
 RD-801V: High altitude of the rocket engine with extended nozzle.

See also
Mayak – Prospective Ukrainian launch vehicle family for which the RD-801 is being developed.
RD-8 – The Zenit second stage vernier engine which was the technological base for the RD-801.
RD-120 – The Zenit second stage main engine which was the technological base for the RD-801
RD-810 – A higher thrust engine of the same family.
Yuzhnoe Design Bureau – The RD-810 designer bureau.
Yuzhmash – A multi-product machine-building company that's closely related to Yuzhnoe and would manufacture the RD-RD-801.
YF-100 – A Chinese rocket engine of similar specifications based on RD-801 design.

References

External links
 Yuzhnoye Design Bureau English-language home page

Rocket engines using kerosene propellant
Rocket engines using the staged combustion cycle
Yuzhnoye rocket engines
Yuzhmash rocket engines
Rocket engines of Ukraine